The Cementerio Presbítero Matías Maestro is a cemetery in Lima, the capital city of Peru.  It is also a museum, though attempts to make it a museum exclusively have failed. The architectural styles of the mausoleums found within are broad ranging. It houses the remains of several important political, military and literary figures. Most prominent of all the mausoleums is the Panteón de los Próceres where heroes of the War of the Pacific (1879–1884) are buried. The mausoleum's entrance reads "La Nación a sus Defensores" (Meaning "The Nation, to its Defenders").

History 
The cemetery was founded around 1807, thanks to the efforts of the priest Matías Maestro. This multifaceted man, born in Vitoria (Spain) in 1776, came to Peru by the end of the 18th century to start a new business. In 1793, he became a Catholic Priest and since then he dedicated himself to “renewing” the churches and altarpieces with the latest fashion style: Neoclassical. He became General Director of Lima's Public Beneficence Society in 1826 and died on January 7, 1835.

External links 
 
 
 Conoce más sobre el cementerio Presbítero Maestro. Puntoedu PUCP, 21.11.2012
 El primer cementerio monumental de América Latina celebra su bicentenario. El Comercio, 31.5.2008
 200 años entre los vivos. La República, 31.5.2008
 Presbítero Maestro: 200 años de historia. Programa TV Domingo al Día, 30.5.2008
 En la caja oscura A series of photographs of the  Cementerio Presbítero Matías Maestro

Cemeteries in Peru
Buildings and structures in Lima
Neoclassical architecture in Peru
Museums in Lima
Tourist attractions in Lima
Cultural heritage of Peru